Poul Hansen (23 April 1922 — 14 June 2017) was a Danish politician from the Conservative People's Party. He was the leader of Vallensbæk Parish Municipality from 1967 and until the formation of the new Vallensbæk Municipality after the 1970 Danish Municipal Reform on 1 April 1970. He became the mayor of the new municipality, and remained in the position until 1993 when Kurt Hockerup, also from the Conservative People's Party, took over. Hansen died on 14 June 2017.

References 

1922 births
2017 deaths
Danish municipal councillors
Mayors of places in Denmark
Conservative People's Party (Denmark) politicians